Sound Off is the second studio album released by the American Christian tween pop girl group, The Rubyz. Similar to other iShine artists, Sound Off features 10 tracks, 5 original and 5 sing-along.  It is the first album featuring The Rubyz as a duo rather than a trio.

Reception 

With the departure of then 14-year-old Marissa Milele, the group's youngest member, in 2009, The Rubyz became a duo. With the new member lineup, the group underwent a change in style.  Staff at Jesus Freak Hideout noted that Sound Off was "a lot more mature than their debut."  Abandoning the sound from their debut album, the review goes on to say that the music sounds like music heard on Top 40 radio.  In addition, the lyrical style has changed.

The review at New Release Tuesday also mentions the new lyrical themes.

Track listing

Personnel 

 Alexis Slifer - vocals
 Cammie Hall - vocals

References 

2009 albums
The Rubyz albums